Prostitution in Algeria is legal but most related activities such as brothel-keeping and solicitation are criminalised. Coastal resorts, particularly Tichy, are destinations for sex tourism. As of 2017 there were two brothels in Algeria.

Legal situation
Algeria's Criminal Code prohibits soliciting in a public place, assisting or profiting from the prostitution of others, living with a person engaged in prostitution, and procuring for the purpose of prostitution. The criminal code also prohibits keeping, managing, or financing an establishment where prostitution occurs. Penalties are harsher if the offence involves a minor, or if threats or coercion are involved.

History

Ottoman rule
During Ottoman rule, prostitution was tolerated and regulated. Prior to the French takeover in 1830, it was estimated that there were 300 to 500 prostitutes in Algiers. The women were Moorish, Arab, and sub-Saharan Africans. Jews were not permitted to become prostitutes.

An official called the Mezouar was in charge of regulating prostitution. This official was always a Moor. The position was lucrative as he collected a monthly levy per prostitute. He kept a register of prostitutes and the women were not allowed to leave the brothels and public baths they worked in.

French rule

French colonization in 1830, the French authorities regulated prostitution to try and prevent the spread of STIs. The regulation system was based on the Ottoman regulations that were previously in place, and the Mezouar was retained, although he had to pay an annual fee of 2,046 francs. Compulsory medical examinations for prostitutes were introduced by decree in July 1830. The main articles of the decree read:

"We, Civil Intendant of French possessions in North Africa; Having regard to Articles 10 and 46 of Title I of the Law of 19–27 July 1791, Considering that experience has made it necessary to revise the regulations in force concerning public girls; have stopped and stop the following: 
Art. 1. Any girl known to be engaged in prostitution shall be registered by the Commissioner of Police, Head of the Central Office, in a register kept for that purpose in the said office. 
Art. 6. As of 1 October, all public women will be required to be visited twice a month and at intervals of fifteen days to have their state of health ascertained. 
Art. 7. This visit will take place at the clinic. However, public women who wish to be visited at home may obtain the faculty by paying an extraordinary fee of 3 francs per visit, as a fee, in favor of the doctor.
Art. 11. The public girls visited at the clinic and recognized as suffering from venereal diseases will be held in this establishment for immediate treatment. As for those who would be visited in their homes and who would be in the same situation, they will be taken to the dispensary by the Police Commissioner. 
Art. 12. To meet the expenses which will result from both the visit and the treatment of the public wives, it will be paid for and by each of these women, at the time of the visit, a remuneration of 5 francs, or 10 francs a month. 
Art. 22. No public girl will be able to leave the city to visit the surrounding tribes without the written permission of the Police Commissioner, head of the Central Office; the same permission will be required to go to the feasts that are given either in the interior or outside the city. 
Art. 24. The remuneration to be paid for each of the girls whose application will be made remains fixed, for the exterior, at 10 francs, and for the interior, at 5 francs."

In spite of the regulations, there were women who worked on the streets illegally. As there was no longer a prohibition for Jewish women, some turned to prostitution.

Brothels were established in all the main garrison towns, generally in the Muslim quarters so as not to offend the European residents. In 1942, the morality police recorded 46 brothels, 79 hotels, 600 furnished apartments, and a hundred clandestine houses used for prostitution in Algiers alone. These numbers remained about the same until independence in 1962.

Ouled Naïl

The Ouled Naïl are a tribe from the Saharan Atlas mountains. They had a tradition of the younger, single women coming down from the mountains to work in the cities as dancers and prostitutes. Once they had saved enough money for a dowry or to buy property, they would return to the mountains. Some historians claim that the Ouled Naïl were dancers only and that the French authorities' preconception that dancers were also prostitutes led to the Ouled Naïl's reputation for prostitution.

Originally their dancing was fully clothed in their traditional clothing. Later it became topless and then fully nude. American dancer Ted Shawn saw them in 1900 and said that the dancing wasn't sexy as it left nothing to the imagination.

Registered prostitutes were referred to as Nailiyas (from Ouled Naïl), and in the latter 19th century, prostitutes in general were referred to as daughters of Ouled Naïl irrespective of their origins. In Biskra, the centre of prostitution in colonial days was the Rue des Ouled Naïl.

Many of the Ouled Naïl women were pressed into service as prostitutes in the mobile brothels (Bordel militaire de campagne) during the Algerian War of Independence and also transported with mobile brothels to Indochina for the use of the troops in Điện Biên Phủ.

Rahbat al-Jammal
During Ottoman rule, resting stops, khans, were built for travellers and their horse and camels. In Constantine, the khans were located at Rahbat al-Jammal. Following the French occupation, the buildings were turned into brothels for the French soldiers. The city elders forbade Algerian women from entering the street. Although the brothels closed down in the 1980s, the ban on women entering the street continues to the present times.

Post-independence
As a result of Arabization of the country, the rise of Islamism and the civil unrest following the economic downturn caused by the 1980s oil glut, brothels were banned in 1982, forcing many of the prostitutes to work on the streets. However, some of the counties 171 brothels were allowed to remain open under the close scrutiny of the police. In 2011 there were 19 supervised brothels operating. By 2015 the number of brothels operating with the complicity of the Algerian authorities had reduced to two.

Sex trafficking

Human traffickers exploit domestic and foreign victims in Algeria for sex trafficking. Undocumented sub-Saharan migrants, primarily from Mali, Niger, Burkina Faso, Cameroon, Guinea, Liberia, and Nigeria, are most vulnerable to sex trafficking in Algeria, mainly due to their irregular migration status, poverty, and language barriers. Unaccompanied women and women travelling with children are also particularly vulnerable to exploitation.

Sub-Saharan African women, often en route to neighbouring countries or Europe, enter Algeria voluntarily but illegally, frequently with the assistance of smugglers or criminal networks. Many migrants, impeded in their initial attempts to reach Europe, remain in Algeria until they can continue their journey. While facing limited opportunities in Algeria, many migrants illegally engage in prostitution to earn money to pay for their onward journey to Europe, which puts them at high risk of exploitation.

Some migrants become indebted to smugglers, who subsequently exploit them in sex trafficking upon arrival in Algeria. For example, female migrants in the southern city of Tamanrasset, the main entry point into Algeria for migrants and for the majority of foreign trafficking victims, are subjected to debt bondage as they work to repay smuggling debts through forced prostitution.

Some migrants also fall into debt to fellow nationals who control segregated ethnic neighbourhoods in Tamanrasset; these individuals pay migrants’ debts to smugglers and then force the migrants into prostitution. Foreign women and children, primarily sub-Saharan African migrants, are exploited in sex trafficking in bars and informal brothels, typically by members of their own communities, in Tamanrasset and Algiers.

The government did not investigate, prosecute, or convict any perpetrators for sex trafficking crimes in 2018, despite reports that sex trafficking occurred in Algeria, especially among the migrant population.

In 2020, the United States Department of State Office to Monitor and Combat Trafficking in Persons downgraded Algeria's rank from "Tier 2 Watch List" to a "Tier 3" country.

Further reading

References

External links

 
Society of Algeria